Castillo San Cristóbal may refer to:
Castillo San Cristóbal (San Juan), Puerto Rico
Castle of San Cristóbal (Santa Cruz de Tenerife), Canary Islands, Spain
Fort San Cristóbal (Spain), Navarre

See also
San Cristóbal (disambiguation)
San Cristóbal de La Paz, a former fortress in Chile